The Canadian federal budget for fiscal year 1987-1988 was presented by Minister of Finance Michael Wilson in the House of Commons of Canada on 18 February 1987.

External links 

 Budget Speech
 Budget Papers

References

Canadian budgets
1987 in Canadian law
1987 government budgets
1987 in Canadian politics